Balázs Tóth (born 2 March 1980) is a professional Hungarian football coach and a former player. He is the manager of Csákvár.

External links
 HLSZ 
 MLSZ 

1980 births
People from Kaposvár
Sportspeople from Somogy County
Living people
Hungarian footballers
Association football defenders
Kaposvári Rákóczi FC players
Újpest FC players
Budapest Honvéd FC players
Vasas SC players
Al-Orouba SC players
BFC Siófok players
Gyirmót FC Győr players
Puskás Akadémia FC players
Szolnoki MÁV FC footballers
Puskás Akadémia FC II players
Þór Akureyri players
Nemzeti Bajnokság I players
Nemzeti Bajnokság III players
1. deild karla players
Hungarian expatriate footballers
Expatriate footballers in Oman
Hungarian expatriate sportspeople in Oman
Expatriate footballers in Iceland
Hungarian expatriate sportspeople in Iceland
Hungarian football managers